This is a list of Norwegian musicians and bands notable enough for Wikipedia articles. The genres are as given in the individual articles.

Acoustic and folk

Alf Prøysen
Annbjørg Lien
Arild Andersen
Bjørn Eidsvåg
Einar Stray Orchestra
Halvdan Sivertsen
Jan Eggum
Julian Berntzen
Kari Bremnes
Lillebjørn Nilsen
Mari Boine
Nils Økland
Odd Nordstoga
Ole Paus
Øystein Sunde
Secret Garden
Staut
Sturle Dagsland
Thea Hjelmeland
Tønes
Vamp
Wardruna

Classical

Aline Nistad
Arve Tellefsen
Bergen Philharmonic Orchestra
Christian Tetzlaff
Det Norske Kammerorkester
Edvard Grieg
Håkon Austbø
Håvard Gimse
Henning Kraggerud
Kjell Bækkelund
Leif Ove Andsnes
Lise Davidsen
Marianne Thorsen
Ole Bull
Ole Edvard Antonsen
Oslo Philharmonic
Ragnhild Hemsing
Rolf Lislevand
Solveig Kringlebotn
Tine Thing Helseth
Trondheim Soloists
Truls Mørk
Vilde Frang
Wolfgang Plagge

Trailer Music

Thomas Bergersen

DJs

Alan Walker (Alan Olav Walker)
Broiler
Cashmere Cat
CLMD
Kygo
KREAM
K-391 (Kenneth Orsberg Nilson)
Lemaitre
Lido
Matoma
Martin Tungevaag
Madden
Boom Jinx
Ralph Myerz
Pegboard Nerds
SeeB

Jazz

Arild Andersen
Anni-Frid Lyngstad
Jon Christensen
Jan Garbarek
John Pål Inderberg
Tord Gustavsen
Karin Krog
Bjarne Nerem
Robert Normann
Terje Rypdal
Torbjørn Sunde
Thorgeir Stubø
Radka Toneff

Pop and rock

a-ha
Alexander Rybak
Ane Brun
Angelina Jordan
Anja Garbarek
Anneli Drecker
Annie
Astrid S
AURORA
Bertine Zetlitz
BigBang
Bobbysocks
boy pablo
Briskeby
Christian Ingebrigtsen (A1)
Crash (n)
Dagny
Carina Dahl
Dance with a Stranger
Deeyah
deLillos
Di Derre
Didrik Solli-Tangen
Donkeyboy
Dråpe
Draumir
Dum Dum Boys
Dylan Mondegreen
Emily Blue
Ephemera
The First Cut
Freddy Kalas
Gabrielle Leithaug
Girl in Red
Gåte
Highasakite
Ida Maria
Iselin Michelsen
Jan Bang
Jan Werner Danielsen
Jarle Bernhoft
The Jessica Fletchers
Jim Stärk
Johns Quijote
Julie Bergan
Kaizers Orchestra
Kakkmaddafakka
Kate Havnevik
Katzenjammer
Kid Astray
The Kids
Kings of Convenience
Ketil Bjornstad
L8R
Lene Marlin
Lilyjets
Lorraine
Ludvig Moon
M2M
Madrugada
Magne Furuholmen
Marcus & Martinus
The Margarets
Maria Haukaas Mittet
Maria Mena
Maria Solheim
Marit Larsen
Morten Abel
Morten Harket
The National Bank
Noora Noor
Per Bergersen
Poor Rich Ones
Savoy
Sigrid (singer)
Silje Nergaard
Sissel Kyrkjebø
Sivert Høyem
Sondre Justad
Sondre Lerche
Sturle Dagsland
Surferosa
Susanna and the Magical Orchestra
Susanne Sundfør
Team Me
Terje Rypdal
Thom Hell
Thomas Dybdahl
TIX
Torgunn Flaten
Trine Rein
Vamp
Velvet Belly
Venke Knutson
William Hut
Winta
Wobbler
Åge Aleksandersen
Ylvis

Hard rock and punk

Amulet
Audrey Horne
Black Debbath
Dum Dum Boys
El Caco
Gluecifer
Johndoe
JR Ewing
Motorpsycho
Seigmen
Skambankt
Stonegard
Thulsa Doom
TNT
Trucks
Turbonegro
Zeromancer

Electronica and similar genres

Aleksander Vinter
Alog
Amethystium
Apoptygma Berzerk
Arcane Station
Bel Canto
Biosphere
Bjørn Torske
Casiokids
Combichrist
Echo Image
Eirik Glambek Bøe
Erlend Øye
Flunk
Håvard Ellefsen
Jaga Jazzist
Jenny Hval
Lindstrøm & Prins Thomas
Martin Tungevaag
Magnus August Høiberg
Margaret Berger
Moyka (singer)
Robert Solheim
Röyksopp
Skymarshall Arts
Sturle Dagsland
Todd Terje
Ugress
Ulver
Wibutee
Xploding Plastix

Rap and hip hop

Trevis Brendmoe
Miss Tati
Tommy Tee
Definite
Diaz
Nico & Vinz
Gatas Parlament
Karpe Diem
Klovner I Kamp
Lars Vaular
Madcon
Side Brok
Stella Mwangi
Erik og Kriss

Metal
Pagans mind (progressive metal/ power metal)
1349 (Black metal)
Aeternus (Death metal)
Abbath (Black Metal)
Age of Silence (Avant-garde/Progressive metal)
Ancient (Symphonic black metal)
Antestor (Black metal)
Arcturus (Avant-garde metal)
Atrox (Avant-garde metal)
Ásmegin (Folk/Viking/Black metal)
Borknagar (Progressive/Folk/Black metal)
Burzum (Black metal/Ambient)
Cadaver (Death metal)
Carpathian Forest (Black metal)
Darkthrone (Black metal)
Den Saakaldte (Black metal)
Dimmu Borgir (Symphonic black metal/Symphonic extreme metal)
Dødheimsgard (Avant-garde/Black/Industrial black metal)
Emily Blue (Death metal/Nu metal)
Emperor (Black metal/Symphonic extreme metal)
Enslaved (Progressive black/Viking metal)
Extol (Progressive/Extreme/Christian metal)
Gehenna (Black metal)
Gorgoroth (Black metal)
Green Carnation (Death metal/Progressive metal)
Glittertind (Black/Viking/Folk metal)
Hades Almighty (Black/Doom metal)
Helheim (Black/Viking metal)
Immortal (Black metal)
I (Black metal)
In the Woods... (Progressive metal)
Isengard (Black/Viking metal)
Khold (Black metal)
Koldbrann (Black metal)
The Kovenant (Avant-garde/Black/Industrial metal)
Lengsel (Progressive/Black metal)
Leprous (Progressive)
Leaves' Eyes (Gothic metal/Symphonic metal)
Limbonic Art (Symphonic black metal)
Madder Mortem (Doom metal/Avant-garde metal/Progressive metal)
Mayhem (Avant-garde/Black metal)
Mortiis (Industrial rock/Ambient)
Myrkskog (Death metal)
Nattefrost (Black metal)
Old Man's Child (Symphonic black metal/Melodic black metal)
Orcustus (Black metal)
Ov Hell (Black metal)
Peccatum (Avant-garde extreme metal/Avant-garde gothic rock)
Posthum (Black metal)
Ragnarok (Black metal)
Ram-Zet (Avant-garde metal)
Satyricon (Black metal)
Sirenia (Gothic metal)
The Sins of Thy Beloved (Gothic-doom/Symphonic metal)
Solefald (Avant-garde metal)
Susperia (Black/Thrash metal)
Taake (Black metal)
The 3rd and the Mortal (Doom metal/Ambient/Experimental)
Theatre of Tragedy (Doom metal/Gothic/Industrial rock)
Thorns (Industrial black metal)
Trail of Tears (Gothic/Symphonic black metal)
Tristania (Gothic metal)
Troll (Melodic black metal/Industrial black metal)
Tsjuder (Black metal)
Ulver (Black/Avant-garde metal/Electronic/Experimental)
Urgehal (Black metal)
Windir (Folk/Black metal)
Winds (Neoclassical progressive metal)
Zyklon (Blackened death metal)
Zyklon-B (Black metal)

Traditional Norwegian folk 

Agnes Buen Garnås
Annbjørg Lien
Anne Hytta
Egil Storbekken
Eivind Groven
Gjermund Larsen
Johan Sara
Jorun Marie Kvernberg
Kirsten Bråten Berg
Knut Buen
Mari Boine
Nils Økland
Øyonn Groven Myhren
Peter L. Rypdal
Sigbjørn Apeland
Sinikka Langeland
Sondre Bratland
Susanne Lundeng

See also
List of Norwegian operatic sopranos

Norwegian music-related lists

Lists of musicians by nationality